Nakai Penny (born 4 April 1996) is a Canadian rugby union player who play for Seattle Seawolves in Major League Rugby (MLR). His usual position is flanker. 

Penny previously played for the University of British Columbia Thunderbirds and Westshore RFC in the BC Premier League competition.

Early life
Penny was born in Penticton, British Columbia in the southern interior of British Columbia. He played his high school rugby with the Penticton Secondary Lakers. In 2014 Penny moved to Vancouver to play for the UBC Thunderbirds rugby squad.

Rugby career
Penny played three seasons with the University of British Columbia, winning three consecutive Rounsefell Cups, the British Columbia provincial championship. Following his career with UBC, Penny suited up with Westshore RFC in the British Columbia Premiership. In 2017 he was selected to play for the BC Bears squad in the Canadian Rugby Championship. BC would go on to win their first MacTier Cup in eight years.

In 2016, Penny was selected to represent the Canadian under-20 side in the 2016 World Rugby Under 20 Trophy qualifier against the United States. He started at openside flanker for the Canadians but unfortunately would be part of a losing effort as the American side converted a long range penalty on the last play of the game to take a 19-18 win.

On 3 January 2018 it was announced that Penny would be joining the Seattle Seawolves for their inaugural season in Major League Rugby.

Club statistics

References

1996 births
Living people
Canadian expatriate rugby union players
Canadian expatriate sportspeople in the United States
Expatriate rugby union players in the United States
Rugby union flankers
Seattle Seawolves players
Sportspeople from Penticton
Canadian rugby union players
Canada international rugby union players